The 1985 Australian Touring Car Championship was a CAMS sanctioned motor racing title for drivers of Touring Cars. It was the 26th running of the Australian Touring Car Championship and the first to be contested using regulations based on the FIA's International Group A regulations after having been run under CAMS home grown Group C rules between 1973 and 1984. The championship began on 10 February 1985 at Winton Motor Raceway (the track's first ever ATCC race) and ended on 14 July at Oran Park Raceway after ten rounds.

Season summary
Triple Bathurst winner Jim Richards won his and BMW's first Australian Touring Car Championship driving a 3.5-litre 6 cyl BMW 635 CSi entered by JPS Team BMW. Defending series champion Dick Johnson finished 2nd in his Ford Mustang (the first time a Mustang had been seen in the ATCC since 1973), with Peter Brock finishing third in his Holden VK Commodore.

The first round of the series at Winton also created history when for the first time since the ATCC was first held in 1960, no Holden of any sort was on the grid. The race also saw the first ever ATCC race win by a BMW with Richards winning by a lap from his new JPS teammate, fellow New Zealander Neville Crichton. Richards' win in the BMW also saw the first ATCC round win by a European car since Jim McKeown won the 7th and final round of the 1970 ATCC at Symmons Plains in a Porsche 911S.

Swedish marque Volvo also joined the winners list when Kiwi Robbie Francevic won Round 3 at Symmons Plains in Tasmania in his Volvo 240T. Still a resident of Auckland, Francevic's win also saw him become the first non-Australian resident to win an ATCC race. The big Kiwi's win in Tasmania in the turbo Volvo was also the first of what would be an eventual 55 ATCC round wins (out of a possible 72) for cars powered by turbocharged engines up until the end of Group A racing in 1992. It was not the first turbocharged car to win an ATCC race however, as George Fury had won the Lakeside round in 1984 in a Nissan Bluebird Turbo.

Richards (Winton, Wanneroo, Adelaide, Calder, Surfers, Lakeside and Amaroo, which staged its first ATCC race since 1978), Brock (Sandown) and Francevic (Symmons Plains and Oran Park) were the only drivers to win a race in the series. That actually gave New Zealand born drivers 9 wins out of the 10 rounds, a record for non-Australian wins that still stands as of 2016.

Jim Richards and John Smith in his Toyota Team Australia Corolla were the only drivers to finish each round of the series. Smith won the Up to 2000cc class at the first nine rounds of the series before finishing a close second behind teammate Drew Price in the final round at Oran Park.

Other drivers/cars who made an impression in Australia's first foray into Group A included Sydney privateer Garry Willmington in his privately entered Jaguar XJS (built from a second hand road car) with its 5.3 litre V12 engine which proved fast but underdone thanks to Willmington's small budget. The Jaguar was often the fastest car in a straight line when it appeared, but Willmington's lack of budget to develop the car saw it lack the handling needed to be competitive on the smaller Australian tracks. Also impressing were Perth based expat Kiwi Tim Slako in an ex-Andy Rouse BTCC Rover Vitesse powered by a 3.5 litre V8, another Kiwi in Jim Richards' JPS teammate Neville Crichton in his BMW, and yet another Kiwi Kent Baigent who joined the series in Adelaide driving his ex-Schnitzer Motorsport BMW 635. Also impressing with giant killing performances was  Formula One World Champion Alan Jones in Colin Bond's second Network Alfa team Alfa Romeo GTV6. Jones, in an Luigi Racing (ETCC) built GTV6 generally out-performed Bond who drove his Alfa which had been converted from Group E to Group A specification in 1984. Jones, contesting his first ever ATCC finished 8th in the championship despite not contesting the final three rounds (Jones would return full-time to F1 in late ). Don Smith and Laurie Nelson both drove a privately entered Ford Mustang each, and even though they would on occasions both achieve decent results in qualifying, lack of reliability and funding kept them well off the pace of Johnson's front running Greens-Tuf Zakespeed Ford Mustang GT.

Teams and drivers
The following drivers and teams competed in the 1985 Australian Touring Car Championship. 

* Peter Brock and John Harvey both drove #05 and #7 during the season.

Race calendar
The 1985 Australian Touring Car Championship was contested over a ten-round series with one race per round.

Classes
Cars competed in three classes determined by engine capacity.
 Up to 2000cc
 2001 to 3000cc
 3001 to 6000cc

Points system
Championship points were allocated on a three tier system, to Australian license holders only, for outright places gained in each round:
 Scale A was applied to drivers of cars in the Up to 2000cc class
 Scale B was applied to drivers of cars in the 2001 to 3000cc class
 Scale C was applied to drivers of cars in the 3001 to 6000cc class

Points from the best nine round results were retained by each driver, any other points not being included in the nett total.

Results

See also
 1985 Australian Touring Car season

References

External links
 Official V8 Supercar site Contains historical ATCC information.
 1985 Australian Touring Car racing images at www.autopics.com.au

Australian Touring Car Championship seasons
Touring Cars